Henrik Sass Larsen (born 29 May 1966 in Virum) is a Danish politician. He is a former member of the Folketing for the Social Democrats political party. He sat in parliament from 2000 to 2019. He was the Danish Minister of Business Affairs and Growth from 2013 to 2015.

Political career
Larsen led the Social Democratic Youth of Denmark from 1992 to 1996. He acted as a substitute member of the Folketing twice during the 1998—2001 term, from 19 January 1999 to 21 March 1999 and again from 16 June 1999 to 22 June 1999. On 1 October 2000 Helle Degn resigned her seat and Larsen took over the seat. He was elected directly into parliament in the 2001 election and was reelected in the 2005, 2007 and 2011 elections. He was the group leader of the Social Democrats in parliament from 2012 to 2013. In 2013 he was appointed Minister of Business Affairs and Growth. He held this position until the 2015 election, where the Social Democrats lost the election to Venstre and so Larsen lost the minister title. He was reelected, and again became the group leader of the Social Democrats. He was elected again in the 2019 election, but resigned his seat shortly after the election. Tanja Larsson took over the seat.

Bibliography
Exodus – vejen frem for centrum-venstre (2018)
Tilbage til Friheden (1996, co-author)
En europæisk utopi (1994, co-author)

References

External links
 

1966 births
Living people
People from Lyngby-Taarbæk Municipality
Social Democrats (Denmark) politicians
Government ministers of Denmark
Members of the Folketing 1998–2001
Members of the Folketing 2001–2005
Members of the Folketing 2005–2007
Members of the Folketing 2007–2011
Members of the Folketing 2011–2015
Members of the Folketing 2015–2019
Members of the Folketing 2019–2022